Andoniaina is a Malagasy given name. Notable people with that name include the following:

Andoniaina Andriamalala (born 1985), Malagasy footballer
Andoniaina Rakotondrazaka Andrianavalona, birthname of Ando Rakotondrazaka (born 1987), Malagasy footballer

See also

Malagasy masculine given names